Ramsden Hall located at 48 Abbey Road in Barrow-in-Furness, Cumbria, England is a Grade II listed former public bath house. Funded by industrialist and local mayor Sir James Ramsden it was constructed in 1872 and was relatively small in comparison to other public baths in Barrow. Despite no longer serving its original purpose Ramsden Hall stands as the only remaining example of a 19th-century public bath in the town. For a period of its history, the building served as an annexe of the adjacent Technical School although at present it is occupied by offices of the Citizens Advice Bureau.

See also
 Listed buildings in Barrow-in-Furness
 Baths and wash houses in Britain

References

Ramsden Hall
Ramsden Hall
Grade II listed buildings in Cumbria
Public baths in the United Kingdom